The 2007 Kano State gubernatorial election occurred on April 14, 2007. ANPP candidate Ibrahim Shekarau won the election, defeating PDP Ahmed Bichi and 14 other candidates.

Results
Ibrahim Shekarau from the ANPP won the election. 16 candidates contested in the election.

The total number of registered voters in the state was 4,072,597.

Ibrahim Shekarau, (ANPP)- 671,184
Ahmed Bichi, PDP- 629,868
Usman Sule, AC- 126,235
Bashiru Nagashi, DPP, 19,871
Umar Danhassan, PSP- 18,963
Shehu Muhammad Dalhat, PAC- 10,429
Balas Kosawa, NDP- 5,876
Yahaya Mohammed Kabo, AD- 5,272
Mohammed Mukhtar Ali, ADC- 4,211
Ismaila Zubairu, APGA- 3,663
Hamisu Iyantama, ND- 2,826
Muhammad Muhammad, NSDP- 2,429
Kabiru Sharfadi, PPA- 2,325
Mustapha Badamasi, CPP- 1,658
Haruna Ungogo, PRP- 1,289
Ahmed Riruwai, RPN- 1,028

References 

Kano State gubernatorial elections
Kano State gubernatorial election
Kano State gubernatorial election